Álvaro Cassuto (born 1938) is a Portuguese composer and conductor.

He was born in Porto, Portugal, in 1938, and studied in Lisbon and Berlin, earning a law degree from the University of Lisbon, and, one year later, a degree in conducting from the Vienna Conservatory.

As a composer, he has received commissions from musical institutions in Portugal and the United States.  His output is mainly orchestral. With his Sinfonias breves (1959–60) he became the first Portuguese composer to adopt integral serialism techniques. He came into contact with Karlheinz Stockhausen, György Ligeti and Olivier Messiaen during Darmstadt courses in 1960 and 1961. In the 1970s, he explored postmodern neo-tonal techniques. In recent years his conducting schedule has tended to take precedence over composing.

Cassuto has been music director of the Portuguese Radio Symphony, the New Portuguese Philharmonia, the Portuguese Symphony Orchestra, the Algarve Orchestra and the Lisbon Metropolitan Orchestra. Abroad he has conducted the RPO and the Orchestre de la Suisse Romande, as well as the orchestras which feature in his recordings (see below).

He is the recipient of numerous awards, including the Koussevitzky Memorial Prize in Tanglewood. In 2009, the President of Portugal awarded him the degree of Grand Officer of the Military Order of Saint James of the Sword to celebrate the 50th anniversary of his career.  
  
He has recorded many highly successful CDs for the Strauss, Portugalsom, Marco Polo and Naxos record labels, notably a series of recordings of Portuguese composers for Naxos with the Bournemouth Symphony, the City of London Sinfonia, the Northern Sinfonia, the National Orchestra of Ireland, the Royal Scottish National Orchestra, among others.

References

External links
 Biography on AvA Musical Editions
 Cassuto's biography on the Naxos web site

1938 births
Living people
Musicians from Porto
Portuguese conductors (music)
Male conductors (music)
Portuguese composers
Portuguese male composers
Portuguese people of Italian descent
University of Lisbon alumni
21st-century conductors (music)
21st-century male musicians